The Vasco da Gama–Chennai Express is an express train belonging to Indian Railways that runs between Vasco da Gama, Goa and  in India.

It operates as train number 17312 from Vasco da Gama to Chennai Central and as train number 17311 in the reverse direction. It is currently the only direct train between Chennai and Goa.

Coaches
The Vasco da Gama–Chennai Express presently has one AC 2 tier, two AC 3 tier, eleven Sleeper class and seven General Unreserved coaches.

As with most train services in India, coach composition may be amended at the discretion of Indian Railways depending on demand.

Schedule

Reversals

Rake sharing

17315/16 Vishwamanava Express

Service
The 17312 Vasco da Gama–Chennai Express covers the distance of 1,070 kilometres in 21 hours 25 mins (49.96 km/hr) and in 23 hours 10 mins (46.19 km/hr) as 17311 Chennai–Vasco da Gama Express.

Routeing
The Vasco da Gama–Chennai Express runs via , Castlerock, Hubli,  to Chennai Central.

It reverses direction at Yesvantpur Junction.

Traction
It is hauled from Vasco to Yesvantpur by a Krishnarajapuram-based WDP-4D. 
From Yesvantpur to Chennai Central it is hauled by a WAP-4 of Electric Loco Shed, Royapuram.

Timetable
17312 departs Vasco da Gama every Thursday at 14:30 hrs IST and arrives Chennai Central at 11:55 hrs IST the next day.
17311 departs Chennai Central every Friday at 13:50 hrs IST and arrives Vasco da Gama at 13:00 hrs IST the next day.
Depart time changed to every Friday 15:00. Arrive time same as 13:00.

Gallery

References

External links

Express trains in India
Rail transport in Goa
Rail transport in Karnataka
Rail transport in Tamil Nadu